Cryptothrips is a genus of thrips in the family Phlaeothripidae.

Species
 Cryptothrips amneius
 Cryptothrips angustus
 Cryptothrips bursarius
 Cryptothrips carbonarius
 Cryptothrips flavus
 Cryptothrips maritimus
 Cryptothrips nigripes
 Cryptothrips okiwiensis
 Cryptothrips pusillus
 Cryptothrips rectangularis
 Cryptothrips sauteri
 Cryptothrips sordidatus

References

Phlaeothripidae
Thrips
Thrips genera